This is a list of traditional Hebrew place names.  This list includes:

Places involved in the history (and beliefs) of Canaanite religion, Abrahamic religion and Hebrew culture and the (pre-Modern or directly associated Modern) Hebrew (and intelligible Canaanite) names given to them.
Places whose official names include a (Modern) Hebrew form.
Places whose names originate from the Hebrew language.

All names are in the Hebrew alphabet with niqqud, and academically transliterated into Tiberian vocalization (of the Masoretic Text) and Standard Hebrew.

Names

See also 
Glossary of Hebrew toponyms
 List of Arabic place names
 List of Aramaic place names
 List of English words of Hebrew origin
 Hebrew name
 Hebraization of Palestinian place names

 
Hebrew